The São Francisco River is a river of Rondônia state in western Brazil. It is a tributary of the São Miguel River.

See also
List of rivers of Rondônia

External links
Brazilian Ministry of Transport

Rivers of Rondônia